Harish Narayan Prabhu Zantye was an Indian politician who served as Member of 10th Lok Sabha from North Goa Lok Sabha constituency and Member of Goa Legislative Assembly from Maem Assembly constituency. He also served as Minister of Social Welfare in Government of Goa.

Personal life 
He was born on 22 September 1935 in Malvan, Sindhudurg district. He married Pushpa H. Zantye on 15 February 1966 and got one son and three daughter. He is the father of Pravin Zantye. On 20 March 2021, he died at the age of 86.

References 

1935 births
2021 deaths
India MPs 1991–1996
Members of the Goa Legislative Assembly
People from Sindhudurg district